James Tackett Klein (born July 31, 1937) was an American politician in the state of Iowa.

Klein was born in Alton, Iowa. He was a  planning analyst. He served in the Iowa House of Representatives from 1967 to 1971 as a Republican.

References

1937 births
Living people
People from Alton, Iowa
Businesspeople from Iowa
Republican Party members of the Iowa House of Representatives